Macrobathra neurocoma is a moth in the family Cosmopterigidae. It is found in Cameroon.

References

Natural History Museum Lepidoptera generic names catalog

Endemic fauna of Cameroon
Macrobathra
Moths described in 1930